Patrick Lynch (10 February 1866 – 9 December 1947) was an Irish barrister who served as Attorney General of Ireland from 1936 to 1941. He was also a Senator for the Labour Panel from 1934 to 1936.

A member of the Irish Parliamentary Party, he took the Parnellite side when that party split.

He was an unsuccessful Irish Parliamentary Party candidate in the East Clare by-election in 1917, losing to Éamon de Valera. He joined Sinn Féin within a year. He opposed the Anglo-Irish Treaty in 1922.

He became a King's Inns bencher in 1925. In a Seanad Éireann by-election held on 28 September 1934, he was elected as a Fianna Fáil Senator, to fill the vacancy caused by the resignation of Arthur Vincent, serving until the body's abolition in 1936.

He was Attorney General of Ireland from 1936 to 1937 and reappointed under the new Constitution, serving from 1937 to 1940. Maurice Healy in his memoir "The Old Munster Circuit" praised Lynch's outstanding integrity and strength of character and, while he was not normally an admirer of Éamon de Valera, praised him for an inspired choice of Lynch as Attorney General.

His youngest brother, James, on the other hand, was state solicitor for Clare under the Cumann na nGaedheal government.

References

External links
 Brendan Ó Cathaoir, "An Irishman's Diary", Irish Times, 9 July 2007

 

1866 births
1947 deaths
Attorneys General of Ireland
Fianna Fáil senators
Members of the 1931 Seanad
Members of the 1934 Seanad
Alumni of King's Inns